Armin Weyrauch (born 22 January 1964 in Friedberg, Hesse) is a German rower. He finished 4th in the men's coxless four event at the 1992 Summer Olympics. He was part of a rowing team that set the world record in 1991.

References

External links 
 
 
 

1964 births
Living people
German male rowers
Olympic rowers of Germany
Rowers at the 1992 Summer Olympics
World Rowing Championships medalists for West Germany
World Rowing Championships medalists for Germany
People from Friedberg, Hesse
Sportspeople from Darmstadt (region)